Kathleen Barr is a Canadian voice actress. She is best known for voicing Marie Kanker and Kevin in Ed, Edd n Eddy and Trixie Lulamoon and Queen Chrysalis in My Little Pony: Friendship is Magic. She also voiced Henri Richard Maurice Dutoit LeFevbre in Liberty's Kids, Dot Matrix in ReBoot, Kaiko Nekton in The Deep, Wheezie in Dragon Tales, and Gelorum in Hot Wheels: World Race and its 4-film sequel AcceleRacers.

Filmography

Animation

 Galaxy Express 999 (1979) – Maetel / Kenae Hoshino / Promethium
 Adieu Galaxy Express 999 (1981) – Maetel / Queen Promethium
 Superbook (1981, TV Series) – Salome / Noah's Wife / Principal Travis / Woman #1 / Rebekah / Rebekah's Mother / Sam / Student
 Maison Ikkoku (1986, TV Series) – Kyoko's Mother (English version)
 Ranma ½ (1990, TV Series) – Cologne
 Ranma ½: Chûgoku Nekonron daikessen! Okite yaburi no gekitô hen (1991) – Cologne / Tsubasa Kurenai (English version)
 Ranma ½: Kessen Tôgenkyô! Hanayome o torimodose!! (1992) – Cologne (English version)
 Conan the Adventurer (1992–1993, TV Series) – Mesmira
 Mega Man: Upon a Star (1993, TV Mini-Series) – Mrs. Kobayashi
 The Baby Huey Show (1993, TV Series)
 Adventures of Sonic the Hedgehog (1993, TV Series) – Momma Robotnik / Katella / additional voices
 Animated Classic Showcase (1993)
 Stone Protectors (1993, TV Series)
 Cinderella (1994) – Stepmother / Stepsister #2 / Fairy Godmother
 Leo the Lion: King of the Jungle (1994, direct-to-video) – Elephant
 Mega Man (1994, TV Series) – Bobby
 King Arthur and the Knights of Justice (1994, TV Series) – Guinevere / Morgana Le Faye
 Exosquad (1994, TV Series) – Colleen O'Reilly
 Conan and the Young Warriors (1994, TV Series) – Sulinara
 Dinobabies (1994–1995, TV Series) – Truman
 Hurricanes (1994–1996, TV Series)
 ReBoot (1994–2001, TV Series) – Dot Matrix, Princess Bula
 Snow White (1995) – Snow White, The Evil Queen
 Hercules (1995) – Hera / Megara
 Littlest Pet Shop (1995, TV Series) – Mumsy / Bernice
 Jingle Bell Rock (1995, TV Short) – Woman / Assistant / Holly Labello
 G.I. Joe Extreme (1995–1996, TV Series)
 Street Fighter (1995–1997, TV Series) – Lucinda Davila
 Billy the Cat (1996, TV Series) – Mom
 Nilus the Sandman (1996, TV Series)
 The Adventures of Corduroy (1996–1997, TV Series)
 The Wacky World of Tex Avery (1997, TV Series) – Chastity Knott
 The Fearless Four (1997) – Wasp #2 / Big Mother Berta / Samantha / Mozart / Mouse
 Mummies Alive! (1997, TV Series) – Chontra / Neith / Sekhmet / Bastet
 Night Warriors: Darkstalkers' Revenge (1997) – Morrigan Aensland
 Salty's Lighthouse (1997–1998, TV Series) – Ocho and Aunt Chovie
 Roswell Conspiracies: Aliens, Myths and Legends (1997–1999, TV Series)
 Rudolph the Red-Nosed Reindeer: The Movie (1998) – Rudolph / Twinkle the Sprite
 Monkey Magic (1998, TV Series) – Fania / Blossom (English version)
 Pocket Dragon Adventures (1998, TV Series) – Scribbles
 Fat Dog Mendoza (1998, TV Series) – Little Costumed Buddy / Spanish Senorita / Gigantic Robot / Ham Hotline Operator / Bespectacled Old Woman / Texas Harry's Girlfriend / Retirement Home Nurse / Union Angry Mob Peasant
 Camelot: The Legend (1998) – Guinevere / Griselda
 Weird-Oh's (1999) – Digger
 NASCAR Racers (1999, TV Movie) – Megan "Spitfire" Fassler
 Sabrina: The Animated Series (1999, TV Series)
 Mama, Do You Love Me? (1999, Video short) – Mama and Woman
 Sherlock Holmes in the 22nd Century (1999-2001)
 Dragon Tales (1999-2005, TV Series) – Wheezie / Max and Emmy's mom / Polly Nimbus / Forest Bird / Whinni's Mother / Mrs. Talent Pool / Miss Tree Snail / Maestro / Misstro / Mungus's Mother / Pooky / Crystal
 Ed, Edd n Eddy (1999-2009, TV Series) – Kevin / Marie Kanker
 Beast Machines: Transformers (2000, TV Series) – Botanica
 Grandma Got Run Over by a Reindeer (2000 – Animated Christmas Special) – I.M. Slime / Rita Spankenheimer / Policewoman
 Casper's Haunted Christmas (2000) – Carol Jollimore
 Robin and the Dreamweavers (2000) – Frass / Anchorwoman
 Rainbow Fish (2000) – Wanda the Octopus / Angel / Mrs. Flounder / Goldie / Turquoise and Blue's Mom
 Generation O! (2000-2001, TV Series) – Mrs. O
 D'Myna Leagues (2000-2001, TV Series) – Divinity Plunkett
 Troll Tales (2000-2001, TV Series) – Snapper
 What About Mimi? (2000-2002, TV Series)
 Scruff (TV series) (2000-2003, - Sanda
 Barbie in the Nutcracker (2001) – Elisabeth Drosselmayer / Owl
 A Christmas Adventure from a Book Called Wisely's Tales (2001) – Honey Bunny
 Rudolph the Red-Nosed Reindeer and the Island of Misfit Toys (2001) – Rudolph / Mrs. Claus / Tooth Fairy / Rocking Horse / Peggy / Dolly for Sue / Adina / Female Cardinal
 Make Way for Noddy (2001, TV Series) – Martha Monkey / Clockwork Mouse
 Super Duper Sumos (2001, TV Series)
 Ultimate Book of Spells (2001-2002, TV Series) – Lucretia
 Sitting Ducks (2001-2003, TV Series) – Bev
 He-Man and the Masters of the Universe (2002) – Evil-Lyn (uncredited)
 Movie Toons: Treasure Island (2002)
 Groove Squad (2002) – Roxanne
 Stargate Infinity (2002-2003, TV Series) – Draga
 Liberty's Kids (2002-2003, TV Series) – Henri LeFevbre
 ¡Mucha Lucha! (2002-2004, TV Series short) – Prima Donna Hodges / Buena Mom / Mrs. Flea / La Piñata / Masked Bus Driver / Irma / Churro / Lady / Baby
 The Cramp Twins (2002-2004, TV Series) – Miss Monkfish
 Bionicle: Mask of Light (2003) – Toa Gali
 Barbie of Swan Lake (2003) – Marie / The Fairy Queen
 My Little Pony: A Charming Birthday (2003, Video short) – Kimono and Sweetberry
 Gadget & the Gadgetinis (2003) – Super G.G.
 Tom and Jerry: Paws for a Holiday (2003)
 Stellaluna (2004, Video short) – Kasuku / Skeptical Bat / Other Bat
 My Scene: Jammin' in Jamaica (2004, TV Short) – Madison
 My Scene: Masquerade Madness (2004, TV Short) – Madison
 Barbie as the Princess and the Pauper (2004) – Serafina / Bertie
 In Search of Santa (2004) – Queen Penelope / Mrs. Clause / Agonysia / Katie / Marcus / Mimi
 Being Ian (2004, TV Series) – Rachel / Dot / European Wheelbarrow Woman / Dr. Edwards
 Dragon Booster (2004-2005, TV Series) – Lance Penn / Marianis / Dragon City News Reporter / Chute
 ¡Mucha Lucha!: The Return of El Maléfico (2005) – Mrs. Flea / Buena Mom / Disco Woman / Queen Voladora
 Barbie: Fairytopia (2005) – Laverna / Pixie #2 / Pixie #4
 Krypto the Superdog (2005, TV Series) – Isis (The cat of Selina Kyle) / Andrea's Mom / Delilah
 Ark (2005) – Piriel
 Hot Wheels: AcceleRacers (2005) – Gelorum
 My Scene Goes Hollywood: The Movie (2005) – Madison
 Barbie and the Magic of Pegasus (2005) – Shiver / Queen / Rayla the Cloud Queen / Eric / Troll / Wife #1
 Hot Wheels Acceleracers the Ultimate Race (2005) – Gelorum
 Bionicle 3: Web of Shadows (2005) – Roodaka / Rahaga Gaaki
 Johnny Test (2005, TV Series) – Lila Test / Janet Nelson Jr. / Blast Ketchup / General's Technician / Tyler / Surfer Dudette / Beatrice
 Firehouse Tales (2005-2006, TV Series)
 Candy Land: The Great Lollipop Adventure (2005) – Princess Frostine
 Coconut Fred's Fruit Salad Island (2005-2006, TV Series) – Mrs. Plumcott
 My Little Pony: The Princess Promenade (2006) – Kimono / Sweetberry
 Barbie Fairytopia: Mermaidia (2006) – Laverna
 Hot Wheels Highway 35 World Race (2005-2006, TV Series) – Gelorum
 Barbie in the 12 Dancing Princesses (2006) – Delia
 Class of the Titans (2006, TV Series) – Athena / The Horae
 Mix Master (2006, TV Series) – Ditt
 Betsy's Kindergarten Adventures (2006, TV Series) – Gabbi
 Powerpuff Girls Z (2006-2007, TV Series) – Cody / Butch / Sam
 Pucca (2006-2008, TV Series) – Ssoso / Doga / Hottie
 Mosaic (2007) – Facade / Mrs. Nottenmyer
 Highlander: The Search for Vengeance (2007) – Moya
 Barbie Fairytopia: Magic of the Rainbow (2007) – Laverna
 ToddWorld (2007, TV Series) – Officer Becky / Child / Elephant
 Roary the Racing Car (2007 TV Series) - Additional Voices
 Betsy Bubblegum's Journey Through Yummi-Land (2007, Video short) – Ruby Red Licorice, Libby Lynn Lily
 The Ten Commandments (2007) – Miriam
 Storm Hawks (2007, TV Series) – Lynn, Garrett (Pork Chop)
 Jibber Jabber (2007, TV Series)  – Jibber / Mom
 Finley the Fire Engine (2007, TV Series) – Polly / Lois
 Tom and Jerry: A Nutcracker Tale (2007) – Nelly
 Bratz (2007, TV Series) – Miss Vanderzandy / Ms. Porterhouse
 Care Bears: Oopsy Does It! (2007) – Best Friend Bear
 Edgar & Ellen (2007-2008, TV Series) – Edgar / Buffy / Judith Stainsworth-Knightleigh / Natalie Nickerson / Berenice / Prehistoric Waitress / Ballet Teacher / Nerdy Girl / Townsperson Actor 1 / Phoebe F. Wellington / Pigeon
 Care Bears: Adventures in Care-a-lot (2007-2008, TV Series) – Best Friend Bear
 Holly Hobbie & Friends: Fabulous Fashion Show (2008) - Portia / Portia's Mom
 Barbie: Mariposa (2008) – Rayna
 Barbie and the Diamond Castle (2008) – Lydia
 Barbie in a Christmas Carol (2008) – Chuzzlewit / Spirit of Christmas Present / Mrs. Dorrit
 Kid vs. Kat (2008-2011, TV Series) – Millie Burtonburger / Kat / Lorne
 Martha Speaks (2008-2013, TV Series) – Ronald Boxwood / Polly / Mrs. Demson
 Barbie: Thumbelina (2009) – Vanessa
 Barbie and the Three Musketeers (2009) – Hèlène
 Inuyasha (2009, TV Series) – Ogre Princess Oni Head
 Hot Wheels Battle Force 5 (2009-2012, TV Series) – Agura Ibaden / Hatch / Kyburi / Zen / Korosivash
 Dinosaur Train (2009-2019, TV Series) – Mrs. Corythosaurus / Trudy Triceratops / Laura Giganotosaurus / Dolores Tyrannosaurus / Velma Velociraptor / Peggy Peteinosaurus / Mrs. Ornithomimus / Angela Avisaurus (One Small Dinosaur/T. Rex Migration) / Erma Eoraptor
 Barbie in A Mermaid Tale (2010) – Eris / Snouts
 Care Bears to the Rescue (2010)
 Hero: 108 (2010, TV Series) – Lady Green / Pangolin Queen
 Care Bears: The Giving Festival (2010) – Best Friend Bear
 The Twisted Whiskers Show (2010, TV Series) – Cutie Snoot / Flouncie
 The Little Prince (2010, TV Series) – Fovea (English version)
 Care Bears: Share Bear Shines (2010) – Best Friend Bear
 Tayo the Little Bus (2010, TV Series) – Tayo, Alice
 My Little Pony: Friendship Is Magic (2010-2019, TV Series) – Hoops (adult) / Foggy Fleece, "Lucy Packard" / Queen Chrysalis / Trixie Lulamoon / Crackle Cosette / Tall Inn-Staying Pony
 Barbie in A Mermaid Tale 2 (2011) – Eris / Snouts / Surfer Kathleen
 Rated A for Awesome (2011, TV Series) – Angelina
 Quest for Zhu (2011) – Mazhula (voice)
 Strawberry Shortcake's Berry Bitty Adventures (2011-2015, TV Series) – Mavis Maraschino
 Slugterra (2012-2013, TV Series) – Master Shanai / Sylvia / Female Restaurant Thug / Granny Molenoid / Mystery Woman
 Littlest Pet Shop (2012-2016, TV Series) – Anna Twombly / Jasper Jones / Madame Pom LeBlanc / Scout Kerry / Largest Ever Pet Shop Cat / Minka's Fantasy Art Gallery Announcer / Vi Tannabruzzo / Rubina Amster / Shahrukh's Personal Assistant / Lavender / Henrietta Twombly / Sunshine Sweetness / Dolores the Slow Loris / Farmer's Market Llama / Anna Twombly (Young) / Fluffy / Gerbil Interviewee / Poppy Pawsley / Fleur le Moose
 Lego Ninjago: Masters of Spinjitzu (2012-present, TV Series) – Misako / Brad / Gene
 Inhumans (2013) – Teacher / Tonjana's Grandmother
 My Little Pony: Equestria Girls (2013) – Trixie Lulamoon (uncredited)
 Wolverine: Origin (2013) – Rose / Aunt Hazel / Agnes
 Barbie: Mariposa & the Fairy Princess (2013) – Gwyllion / Anu
 Sabrina: Secrets of a Teenage Witch (2013-2014, TV Series) – Enchantra / Tiffany Titan / Zanda / Troll Mistress / Max / Audience Member 2 / Student
 Max Steel (2013-2015, TV Series) – Katherine Ryan / Cute Girl / Security Voice / Laser-Lass
 Pac-Man and the Ghostly Adventures (2013-2015, TV Series) – Madame Ghoulasha
 Wolverine versus Sabretooth (2014, TV Series) – Storm / Woman / Feral / Wolfsbane
 Barbie: The Pearl Princess (2014) – Madame Ruckus
 LeapFrog Letter Factory Adventures DVD Series (2014, Video short) – Cousin Toad / Chief
 My Little Pony: Equestria Girls – Rainbow Rocks (2014) – Trixie Lulamoon
 Dr. Dimensionpants (2014-2015, TV Series) – Ann-Mary Lipton / Liz Business
 Slugterra: Eastern Caverns (2015) – Dai-Fu (voice)
 Dinotrux (2015, TV Series) – Drillian
 The Deep (2015-2019, TV Series) – Kaiko Nekton / A.I.M.Y. / Allen / Tethys
 Barbie in Princess Power (2015) – Newton
 Supernoobs (2015-2019, TV Series) – Shope's mother / Emma #3 / Ms. Kandinsky / Teen Worker / Princess Parsec / Queen Bee-anca / Female News Anchor / Kevina
 Open Season: Scared Silly (2016) – Bobbie / Edna / Tree-Hugger Lady
 Gintama° (2016, TV Series) – Young Shinsuke Takasugi
 Kong: King of the Apes (2016, TV Series) – Botila / Female Newscaster / Donny Botila Clone #1 / Botila Clone #2 / Botila Clone #3 / Zippy / Middle Eastern Reporter / Mummo
 Mack & Moxy (2016, TV Series) – Moxy / Sheriff Hiya / Mrs. Squiggly / Nolie
 Barbie: Spy Squad (2016) – Violet / Alarm
 Barbie & Her Sisters in a Puppy Chase (2016) – Silver / Island Hostess
 My Little Pony: Equestria Girls – Legend of Everfree (2016) – Trixie Lulamoon
 Ghost Patrol (2016) - Spooky / Mrs. Choi / Cat
 Tarzan and Jane (2017, TV Series short) – Kala / Veronica / Reporter / Dr. Blutgeld
 Super Monsters (2017, TV Series) – Glorb / Dr. Jennifer Jekyll
 Llama Llama (2018, TV Series) – Grandma Llama / Mama Gnu / Lenora Leopard / Ramona Rhino / Eleanor Elephant
 My Little Pony: Equestria Girls – Forgotten Friendship (2018) – Trixie Lulamoon
 ReBoot: The Guardian Code (2018, TV Series) – Dot Matrix / Alyx
 The Hollow (2018, TV Series) – Witches / Security Guard
 Polly Pocket (2018, TV Series) – Barb, Captain Roco / Tanisha / Grunwalda Grande
 Corner Gas Animated (2018-2019, TV Series) – Dora / Mavis / Helen / Tina / Queen Bee / Pregnant Woman #1 / Middle Aged Woman / Woman's Voice / Blind Woman / Accountant #2 / Player #1 / Bunny / CEO / Drug Lord's Daughter / Mother / Gail
 Super Dinosaur (2018-2019, TV Series) – Sarah Kingston / Tricerachops / Earth Core Agent (1) / Earth Core Trainee #1 / Female Earth Core Tech
 Mega Man: Fully Charged (2018-2019, TV Series) – Hypno Woman / Blasto Woman
 Chip and Potato (2018-2019) – Mrs. Flingo / Mrs. Woolly / Granny Fant / Aardvark Grandma / Lily Llama / Carrie Orangutan / Ma Fant
 My Little Pony: Equestria Girls – Spring Breakdown (2019, TV Movie) – Trixie Lulamoon / Puffed Pastry
 My Little Pony: Equestria Girls – Sunset's Backstage Pass (2019, TV Movie) – Puffed Pastry
 My Little Pony: Equestria Girls – Holidays Unwrapped (2019) – Trixie Lulamoon
 The Bravest Knight (2019) - Big Yeti 
 The Willoughbys (2020) – The Perfect Mom (voice)
 My Little Pony: Pony Life (2020-present) – Trixie (voice)
 Johnny Test (2021 TV series) (2021, TV Series) - Lila Test / Cop / Type "n" Talk / Blast Ketchup / Lab Alarm / Spectator / Tonal Translator

Video games
 ReBoot (1998) – Dot Matrix
 SSX Tricky (2001) – Front End Voice – North America
 Dragon Tales: Dragon Seek (2001) – Wheezie
 Dragon Tales: Dragon Frog Jamboree (2001) – Wheezie
 Impossible Creatures (2002) – Lucy Willing / Velika La Pette
 Frogger Beyond (2002) – Frogger
 Ed, Edd n Eddy: Jawbreakers! (2002) – Marie Kanker / Kevin
 Ys VI: The Ark of Napishtim (2003) – Marve / Sophia / Sia / Olha / Jue
 SSX 3 (2003)
 Frogger's Adventures: The Rescue (2003) – Frogger
 Dragon Tales: Learn & Fly with Dragons (2004) – Wheezie
 Under the Skin (2004) – Jill Valentine / Little Boy / Woman Cop / Casual Girl / Old Woman / Sexy Bunny / Becky
 Frogger: Ancient Shadow (2005) – Frogger
 Devil Kings (2005) – Lady Butterfly
 Ed, Edd n Eddy: The Mis-Edventures (2005) – Marie Kanker / Kevin
 Ed, Edd n Eddy: Scam of the Century (2007) – Kevin
 Cartoon Network Universe: FusionFall (2009) – Marie Kanker
 My Little Pony: Friendship is Magic (2012) – Trixie Lulamoon / Queen Chrysalis

Live-action
 E! True Hollywood Story (1996, episodes 1-5) – Narrator of 2019 reboot
 Warriors of Virtue (1997) – Tsun (voice)
 The Secret Life of Algernon (1997) – Eulalia (voice, uncredited)

Other
 Care Bears – Best Friend Bear / Take Care Bear (as plush toys)
 Dragon Tales – Wheezie (as a plush toy with Zak with light-up badge)

References

External links
 
 

Living people
Canadian video game actresses
Canadian voice actresses
Actresses from Toronto
Actresses from Vancouver
Audiobook narrators
20th-century Canadian actresses
21st-century Canadian actresses
1967 births